M'Sila Airport was a public use airport located near M'Sila, M'Sila Province, Algeria. Listed coordinates show the bulldozed remains of what might have been an  runway.

See also

Transport in Algeria
List of airports in Algeria

References

External links 
 

Airports in Algeria
Defunct airports
Buildings and structures in M'Sila Province